Merritt Patrick "Sugar" Cain (April 5, 1907 – April 3, 1975) was an American professional baseball pitcher who worked in 178 games in the major leagues as a member of the Philadelphia Athletics (–), St. Louis Browns (1935–) and Chicago White Sox (1936–).

Over three-quarters of Cain's MLB appearances came as a starting pitcher, and during his career, he amassed 58 complete games and two shutouts. Although his won–lost record was only 53–60 (.469) with an earned run average of 4.83, he posted seasons of 13 and 15 (1936) wins. However, Cain exhibited poor control of his repertoire, allowing more than 100 bases on balls for three straight seasons (1933–1935), leading the American League in walks issued (123) in 1935, and averaging 5.2 walks per nine innings pitched over his big-league career. Altogether, in 987 innings, Cain allowed 1,119 hits and 569 bases on balls, with 279 strikeouts.

His pitching career ended in the minor leagues in 1943, although he returned to the game to manage the Vidalia-Lyons Twins in the Class D Georgia State League for part of the 1948 campaign. He died in Atlanta on April 3, 1975, only two days before his 68th birthday.

External links

1907 births
1975 deaths
Anniston Rams players
Baltimore Orioles (IL) players
Baseball players from Georgia (U.S. state)
Birmingham Barons players
Carrollton Champs players
Chicago White Sox players
Harrisburg Senators players
Knoxville Smokies players
Major League Baseball pitchers
Minor league baseball managers
Philadelphia Athletics players
St. Louis Browns players
St. Paul Saints (AA) players
Sportspeople from Macon, Georgia